Suspects in Love is a 2010 TVB modern drama series.

Plot
In order to rescue her best friend Coco Kam (Lau Yuk Chui), masseuse Cheng Siu-Yan (Flora Chan) is embroiled in a triad murder case. Misconceiving that she has killed someone, Yan hides away from the police and gangsters by reluctantly returning to her long-separated father Cheng Tsun-Cheong (Shek Sau).

Cheong opens a Chinese herbal tea shop but the business is failing. Yan drags through the days stressfully until Ng Chung-Ming (Ma Tak Chung) comes into her life. Ming claims to have a secret prescription for making Chinese herbal tea but he is actually an undercover cop. By investigating Yan's case, Ming hopes to get promoted and marry his inspector girlfriend Cheung Sz-Man (Sharon Chan) at the end. Ming's supervisor Cheung Sz-Chai (Chan Kwok Bong) used to oppress him a lot and Ming lost confidence at work. However, ever since he met the cheerful Yan, Ming begins to develop his self-esteem and find his life path. His delicate relationship with Yan also starts to grow.

Ming's younger brother Ng Chung-Hong (Law Chung Him) meets Yan's younger sister Cheung Siu-Man (Mandy Wong) and love grows spontaneously. However, Yan finds out Ming's identity and she believes that the two brothers are making use of them to carry out an investigation. On the other hand, Ming learns that Yan's cousin, Leung King-Ho (Yuen Shiu Cheung), is released from jail and that he was familiar with a gang leader, so Yan is considered in connection with the case. Their blossoming relationship is thrown into turmoil as they get closer to the truth.

Cast

Other cast

Viewership ratings

Awards and nominations
TVB Anniversary Awards (2010)
 Nominated: Best Drama
 Nominated: Best Actor (Joe Ma)

References

External links
TVB.com Suspects in Love - Official Website 

TVB dramas
2010 Hong Kong television series debuts
2010 Hong Kong television series endings